Germany competed at the 1900 Summer Olympics in Paris, France.

Medalists
Germany finished in seventh position in the final medal rankings, with four gold medals and nine medals overall.

Results by event

Aquatics

Swimming

Germany's first appearance in swimming came in 1900. The German team took gold in the team event. Hoppenberg also earned a gold medal in the backstroke.

Water polo

Germany competed in the inaugural men's water polo tournament. The German team was defeated in its first game, splitting 5th place with the other 2 quarterfinal losers.

Athletics

Six German athletes had 10 entries in nine athletics events, not winning any medals.

 Track events

 Field events

Cycling

The second Olympic cycling competition saw Germany appear for its second time. Duill won a silver medal in the points race.

Equestrian

Germany had one equestrian at the first Olympic equestrian competition.

Fencing

Germany first competed in fencing at the Olympics in the sport's second appearance. The nation sent one fencer and sometimes claims a second—Willy Sulzbacher was a French national living in France, but competed for German fencing club Deutscher und Österreichischer Fechterbund.

Gymnastics

Germany, which had dominated the first gymnastics competitions four years earlier, failed to win a medal in the second Olympic gymnastics competition.

Rowing

Germany competed in the first Olympic rowing events, represented by 4 boats. In the coxed four, where two separate finals were held, the 3 German boats took one gold and one bronze in the "B" final and another bronze in the "A" final. The eight boat placed 4th.

Rugby

Germany was one of three teams to compete in the first Olympic rugby games. Germany lost its only game, against France. The game against Great Britain was cancelled due to travel plans.

 Summary

 Match 1

Sailing

Germany's four sailors were fairly successful in the 1900 events, taking 2 medals. They took the silver medal in the open class and the gold in the 1-2 ton, but disqualified from the ½-1 ton class for being overweight.

Notes

References

Nations at the 1900 Summer Olympics
1900
Olympics